Louise Simard (born 1950) is a Quebec writer.

She was born in Montreal and grew up in Mont-Laurier, Quebec. As of 2010, she was living in Stoke in the Eastern Townships.

Simard earned a master's degree and Doctorate in French studies from the Université de Sherbrooke.

In 1992, her book La très noble demoiselle was nominated for the Governor General's Award for French-language fiction. She was awarded the Prix Alfred-Desrochers in 1995 for the novel Laure Conan, la romancière aux rubans, the Prix Jean-Hamelin in 1996 for Le médaillon dérobé and the Grand Prix littéraire Archambault in 2001 for her novel Thana, La fille-rivière.

Published books 
 La très noble demoiselle, 1992 
 Laure Conan: La Romanciere aux Rubans, 1995 
 La Route de Parramatta,  1998 
 Thana: La fille-rivière, 2000 
 Thana, 2002 
 Thana: Les vents de Grand'Anse, 2004 
 La Promesse, 2004 
 Où sont allés les engoulevents ?, 2005 
 Comme plume au vent, 2007 
 La Chanson de l'autour, 2008 
 Kila et le gerfaut blessé, 2008 
 Le retour du pygargue, 2009 
 Éliza et le petit duc, 2009 
 La Communiante, 2010

References 

Living people
1950 births
Writers from Montreal
People from Mont-Laurier
Canadian women novelists
20th-century Canadian novelists
21st-century Canadian novelists
Université de Sherbrooke alumni
20th-century Canadian women writers
21st-century Canadian women writers
Canadian novelists in French